SOCOM U.S. Navy SEALs: Fireteam Bravo 3 is a video game for the PlayStation Portable handheld and the Slant Six sequel to SOCOM U.S. Navy SEALs: Fireteam Bravo 2. The game was released on February 16, 2010. Fireteam Bravo 3 features a new campaign and features like the all new online campaign co-op as well as online play supporting medals and ribbons and leaderboards. The title would also support the ability to unlock these weapons and gear. It also boasts team focused gameplay that will allow new ways for players to interact, expanding on the team orientated, authentic, military experience that the franchise is famous for as well as a compelling narrative story in a cutting edge presentation. The online multiplayer servers were shut down on August 31, 2012.

Plot
The player assumes the role of Calvin "WRAITH" Hopper leading a team of Navy SEALs in a covert operation in a matter of national security to track down and interrogate former KGB agent, Vasyli Gozorov, who is believed to be withholding information on a forthcoming attack with weapons of mass destruction.

Reception
SOCOM U.S. Navy SEALs: Fireteam Bravo 3 has generally received mixed to positive reviews. GameSpot stated that it is "Fairly easy, with little tactical depth", while IGN said that "the story was short, but the multiplayer kept it going."

References

External links
 Official SOCOM website
 Slant Six Games Official Site
 PlayStation.com Official Game Page

2010 video games
Multiplayer and single-player video games
PlayStation Portable games
PlayStation Portable-only games
SOCOM U.S. Navy SEALs
Third-person shooters
Video games about the United States Navy SEALs
Video games developed in Canada
Slant Six Games games
Sony Interactive Entertainment games